Camlough is a village five kilometres west of Newry in County Armagh, Northern Ireland. The village is named after a lake, known as Cam Lough, in the parish, which is about 90 acres in extent. South of the village is Camlough Mountain (Slieve Girkin, Sliabh gCuircín) which is part of the Ring of Gullion. The Ring of Gullion (meaning "hill ring of Slieve Gullion") is a geological formation and area and is officially designated as an Area of Outstanding Natural Beauty, (AONB). Camlough had a population of 1,074 at the 2011 Census.

History 
There is much evidence of pre-Christian settlers in and around the village: the erection of Dolmens on Camlough Mountain, The Hag's Chair in Lislea and the Ballykeel Dolmen which all point towards Stone Age dwellers.

Camlough was an ecclesiastical district in the Barony of Upper Orior and was anciently part of the O'Hanlon's country. At the time of the Plantation of Ulster, 1000 acres of 12 townlands were granted to Henry McShane O'Neill and the village was developed during this period.

Camlough village is in the townland of Cross, referring not to a stone monument but to the village crossroads in the north of the townland. In 1620 Camlough Mountain was known as Sliabh na Croise, meaning 'Mountain of the Cross'.

Camlough Lake 
Camlough Lake was formed as a glacial ribbon lake, and takes its name from its irregular shape; although its modern form does not appear particularly crooked, its shape was much less regular in the past before its level was raised by the embankment built in the late 19th century. The glacial left-over sits in a valley carved between Slieve Gullion and Camlough Mountain and is today the largest lake in the Ring of Gullion.

Close to the shore of the lake is an approximately one kilometre long tunnel, wide enough to drive an articulated truck into, which was excavated in the 1960s as part of a planned development intended to create a man-made cavern within Camlough Mountain which was to have been used to store and release water to generate electricity. It was planned that the pumped hydro storage scheme, when operational, would generate more than 200 megawatts of electricity had it been completed; however, plans were shelved with the onset of The Troubles.

Camlough Mountain  (Sliabh gCuircín)

The rock that makes up Camlough Mountain is called granodiorite. Granodiorite, just like the rocks that make up Slieve Gullion, forms from the cooling, deep underground, of molten magma. However, unlike the rocks that make up Slieve Gullion and the Ring of Gullion, which were formed around 60 million years ago, the granodiorites of Camlough Mountain are around 400 million years old. Whereas the younger rocks of Gullion are associated with igneous activity related to the formation of the present day Atlantic Ocean, the rocks of Camlough Mountain are associated with igneous activity related to the closure of a precursor to the present day Atlantic, the now long disappeared Iapetus Ocean.

Camlough National School

Camlough National School was built in 1836 and was located on the Quarter Road. It was divided into a boys' school and a girls' school. The classroom was heated by a pot-bellied stove in the centre of the room and pupils would have been sent to collect sticks for the fire.

Mass Rock

A Mass Rock (Carraig an Aifrinn), dating from the Penal era, is located in Camlough. It is situated in Grant's Rocks and is over 300 years old. In 2003, a special Mass was held at the Mass Rock in memory of the people who suffered during Penal times.

St Malachy's Church, Carrickcruppen, is the oldest church building in the Parish of Lower Killeavy. It was built in 1816 and replaced an earlier church.

Kelly's Mill

Camlough River is a small meandering stream that makes its way from Camlough to the Newry Canal. It was once a vibrant fast flowing river, teeming with trout and the power source of approximately nine mills. The first of these mills was Kelly's Flax and Scutching Mill in Camlough village. It was situated to the rear of Carragher's house. Established around the mid-18th century, the mill comprised nine buildings, two of which were split level. It was powered by water from two ponds on either side of the Keggal Road.

Irish War of Independence – 1920s 
During the Irish War of Independence, the Camlough Company of the Irish Republican Army were active in the area and were commanded by Frank Aiken (1898–1983). In December 1920, approximately 200 IRA volunteers, led by Aiken, attacked Camlough Royal Irish Constabulary barracks. They exchanged fire with the RIC, threw grenades and set fire to the building. British troops sent from Newry were ambushed by the IRA who opened fire and threw grenades from a bridge overhead. Three volunteers were fatally wounded. The next day, British forces set fire to several homes and businesses in Camlough in reprisal, many of them owned by Aiken's relatives.

The Troubles 

Camlough is situated in South Armagh, which was the most militarised region in Western Europe during the Troubles. The region was a stronghold of support for the Provisional IRA, earning it the nickname 'Bandit Country' (see Provisional IRA South Armagh Brigade).

On 19 May 1981, five British soldiers were killed in an Irish Republican Army (IRA) landmine attack on the Chancellors Road 3 miles from Camlough. The soldiers had been travelling in a Saracen armoured personnel carrier when the bomb exploded. This attack was during the 1981 Irish hunger strike in Maze (HM Prison), and 3 miles from the home of one of the hunger strikers, Raymond McCreesh.

Sports 
Open Water / Marathon Swimming
Since breaking the Open Water Relay Guinness World Record the lake has been a prominent training ground for Triathletes and Open Water Swimmers. Local Swimmer and CLWF Chairman Padraig Mallon then went on to complete the English and North Channel in the same year (only 3rd person to ever do so). His sister Colleen Mallon went on to break the Irish record for crossing the North Channel in 2014 and Keith Garry completed the English Channel in 2014. The area has also produced 2 successful relay teams crossing the North Channel and world-class ice swimmers.

Camlough Rovers F.C. is the local football team, playing in the Mid-Ulster Football League.

Camloch is famous for its links with the Gaelic Athletic Association (GAA). The village hosts two Gaelic football clubs. St Patrick's Carrickcruppen GFC has won four Senior county championships; Shane O'Neill's GAC, a continuation of the first Camloch club (William O'Brien's, founded in 1888), has won two Senior and three Junior titles.

Craobh Rua Camloch hurling club was established in 1991 in the Camlough and Bessbrook areas of South Armagh. As hurling had not been played in the area in some 40 years, the club received some help from Armagh Hurling Board chairman, Jimmy Carlisle, who helped set up coaching courses for the children and their mentors. Over its first ten years the club has successfully fielded teams at under 12, under 14, under 16 and since 2010 at under 8, minor and senior levels. They play their home games at Dunster Park (An Dún Rua) on High Street, Derrymore.

In 2010 the Seniors reached the Junior Championship Final and subsequently made it to the semi-final of the Ulster championship. The Under 14s won the 2010 Championship and the Feile, and represented County Armagh in the All Ireland Feile in Ennis, where they reached the semi-final.  There are currently three Craobh Rua players representing Armagh at senior inter-county level, Fiachra Bradley, Micheal Garvey and Ryan Lewis.

World Record 
A Guinness World Record for the longest open water relay swim was broken by a team of intrepid swimmers at Camlough Lake in South Armagh on Saturday 19 September 2009. The group beat the world record for a 'continuous long-distance relay swim' after embarking on the world beating attempt over a week before.

Two hundred swimmers from across Ireland took part in the challenge. The previous record was 480 km; Camlough set the record at 680 km.

Places of interest 
 Ballykeel Dolmen and Cairn are south west of Camlough, at the western foot of Slieve Gullion. The dolmen is an example of a portal dolmen and is made up of two portal stones with a sill between, and a lower backstone supporting a huge capstone.

Events 
Feile Chamlocha is the annual festival held in Camlough in the summer months including Camlough Festival and the Crooked Lake Triathlon
Crooked Lake Triathlon is an annual triathlon held in Camlough in June.
Camlough Lake Water Festival CLWF is home to Irelands only outdoor / open water swimming festival over a weekend in August. As well as introductory swimming events the lake also hosts the National 5k & 10k swims for Swim Ireland.

Education 
 St. Malachy's Primary School
 St Paul's High School, Bessbrook

Demography 
Camlough is classified as a Village by the Northern Ireland Statistics and Research Agency (NISRA) (i.e. with population between 1,000 and 2,499 people). On Census Day (27 March 2011) the usually resident population of Camlough Settlement was 1,074, accounting for 0.06% of the NI total. Of these:

25.33% were aged under 16 years and 8.66% were aged 65 and over;
the median age was 31;
49.26% of the population were male and 50.74% were female;
97.30% were from a Catholic background and 1.68% were from a 'Protestant and Other Christian (including Christian related)' background

Notable residents 

 Eugene O'Callaghan (1888-1973) - Roman Catholic Bishop of Clogher 1943–1969
 Donn Byrne (1889-1928) - Irish-American poet and novelist
 Frank Aiken (1898-1983) - Chief of Staff of the Irish Republican Army during the War of Independence; founding member of Fianna Fáil; Tánaiste from 1965 to 1969
 Tomás Cardinal Ó Fiaich (1923-1990) - Catholic Cardinal; Archbishop of Armagh and the Primate of All Ireland.
 Paddy Quinn (born 1952) - member of the Provisional IRA who took part in the 1981 Irish hunger strike.
 Raymond McCreesh (1957-1981) - member of the Provisional IRA who died on hunger-strike in 1981
 Conor Murphy (born 1963) - Sinn Féin Member of Parliament for Newry and Armagh 2005–2015
 Andrew Britton (1981-2008) - author 
 Conor McGinn (born 1984) - Labour MP for St Helens North 2015–present

References 

 Newry and Mourne District Council
 South Armagh Tourism

Villages in County Armagh